Johann Ludwig von Wolzogen (1599–1661) was an Austrian nobleman and Socinian theologian.

Wolzogen was born in Nové Zámky (modern Slovakia), known then as Neuhäusel in German and Érsekújvár in Hungarian. He inherited the titles of Baron of Tarenfeldt and Freiherr of Neuhäusel.

Comenius became acquainted with Wolzogen in 1638. And Wolzogen took issue with the followers of Descartes. Wolzogen was a distinguished exegete, and, besides his Bible commentaries, wrote a Compendium religionis Christiana and a criticism of the doctrine of the Trinity . Among the early Unitarians Wolzogen is among those noted for his uncompromising preaching of pacifism. along with Joachim Stegmann and Daniel Zwicker.

He died in Silesia.

Works

Translations from French to Polish by Wolzogen
 Johann Ludwig Wolzogen - Uwagi do medytacji metafizycznych René Descartes'a (Polish)

Posthumous
  Biblioteca Fratrum Polonorum Vol.vii-viii Johannis Ludovici Wolzogenii Baronis Austriaci : Opera omnia, exegetica, didacteca, et polemica, Quorum Seriem versa pagina exhibet, Cum indicibus necessariis. Frans Kuyper Amsterdam 1668
 De Scripturarum interprete adversus exercitatorem paradoxum libri duo  1668

Online edition
 Bibliotheca Fratrum Polonorum Online

References 

1599 births
1661 deaths
17th-century Austrian Roman Catholic theologians
Barons of Austria
Austrian Unitarians
Austrian people of Hungarian descent
People from Nové Zámky